The Wondiwoi tree-kangaroo (Dendrolagus mayri) is a critically endangered, bear-like mammal native to tropical mountain forests on the island of New Guinea (in eastern Indonesia). Elusive and rare, it was considered extinct until rediscovery in 2018. It is a species of tree-kangaroo (genus Dendrolagus), a group of long-tailed, bear-like animals native to Australia and New Guinea that mostly live in trees and feed on plant matter. Tree-kangaroos belong to the macropod family (Macropodidae) with kangaroos, and carry their young in a pouch like most other marsupials. The Wondiwoi tree-kangaroo is likely threatened by hunting, and is known only from remote mountains on the Wondiwoi Peninsula in northwest New Guinea.

Until 2018, the wondiwoi tree-kangaroo was known only from a single specimen collected in 1928. The only known specimen is a male weighing . D. mayri was located in the Wondiwoi Peninsula of West Papua at an elevation of  within montane forest. Re:wild, the global conservation organization, lists the Wondiwoi tree-kangaroo as one of their "25 most wanted lost species".

Taxonomy
It was named in honour of Ernst Mayr, who collected the type specimen now deposited in the Natural History Museum, London. It was described by Lord Rothschild and Capt. Guy Dollman in a 1933 paper and an illustration based on the only known specimen was published in their 1936 monograph on the genus.

Discovery
In July 2018, what may prove to be the first ever photographs of the species were taken by British naturalist Michael Smith. Smith was investigating Vireya rhododendrons in an unexplored area of the Wondiwoi ranges and photographed a "dorianus type" tree kangaroo at an altitude of approximately 1,600 metres. Scent marks, tree kangaroo scat and claw marks at the base of trees made by climbing tree kangaroos were found from 1,700 m to 2,000 m in steep montane forest. Local hunters, who frequently kill grizzled tree-kangaroos in lowland forest, rarely if ever visit the forest above 1,500 m because of the difficult terrain, lack of water sources and dense bamboo thickets. An expert-led monograph on the genus discusses this "first photograph of a living animal" and asks "What other novel observations are out in the cloud forests of New Guinea?":

Status
Long thought to be extinct or critically endangered, the IUCN Red List listed the species as critically endangered (possibly extinct) because "if the species still exists the population must be very small (less than 50 mature individuals) and probably in decline due to hunting pressures. Although the area has not been well-sampled, there have been a few visits to the area with no reports of this species."

The species status of Dendrolagus mayri is uncertain. Some authorities refer to all 'dorianus type' tree kangaroos as subspecies of Doria's tree kangaroo, including Colin Groves, who published a major revision of the taxonomy of the genus in 1982. More recent DNA analysis indicates, however, that the members of the dorianus group deserve species status, although Dendrolagus mayri itself was not included in the study.

References

Macropods
Marsupials of New Guinea
Mammals described in 1933